Lasterbach is a river of Rhineland-Palatinate and Hesse, Germany. It flows into the Elbbach in Elbtal.

See also
List of rivers of Rhineland-Palatinate
List of rivers of Hesse

References

Rivers of Rhineland-Palatinate
Rivers of Hesse
Rivers of the Westerwald
Rivers of Germany